Matthew Nable (born 8 March 1972) is an Australian film and television actor, writer, sports commentator and former professional rugby league player. After playing in the Winfield Cup Premiership during the 1990s for the Manly-Warringah and South Sydney clubs, he wrote and starred in the rugby league-centred drama The Final Winter in 2007. Nable went on to act in films such as Killer Elite and Riddick. He appeared on The CW's Arrow and Legends of Tomorrow as Ra's al Ghul.

Early life
Nable grew up on the Northern Beaches of Sydney and also, as a young boy, spent two years at Portsea, Victoria, when his father, Dave, a soldier, was stationed there. His father had also worked as a trainer for the Australian national rugby league team, and his brother, Adam Nable, would become a professional player as well.

Career

Sporting
Matt Nable rose through the junior ranks at the Manly-Warringah club and made five appearances for the Graham Lowe-coached team over 1991 and 1992. Following this he wouldn't appear in the premiership until 1995 when he played three games for the South Sydney Rabbitohs.

After another season in England where he played for Carlisle before moving to the London Broncos, Nable quit football and then tried his hand at boxing, fighting for the state light-heavyweight title as an amateur. He then worked as a beer salesman and personal trainer, but eventually decided to leave paid employment to become a writer.

Writing and acting

After encouragement from his mentor, Booker Prize-winning novelist Thomas Keneally, Nable wrote a screenplay for The Final Winter based on his unpublished novel of the same name. With friends he also managed to raise $1.6m and they worked together to make the film which was released in 2007, and earned critical praise but was a box office failure.

Nable went on to act in the United States as a Los Angeles detective in the 2008 television movie S.I.S..

In 2009, his book We Don't Live Here Anymore was published, in 2011 he published his second book Faces in the Clouds, which won critical praise.

He worked as a writer on Channel 7's rugby league comedy programme, The Matty Johns Show.

Nable appeared in the main cast of critically acclaimed and award-winning SBS drama series, East West 101, and in the 2011 action film Killer Elite alongside Clive Owen, Robert De Niro, Yvonne Strahovski, Jason Statham, and Dominic Purcell.

Nable starred in the 2012 Australian drama series, Bikie Wars: Brothers in Arms. The same year he was announced as a cast member of another Australian TV series, Underbelly: Badness. He also had a role in the film 33 Postcards.

He appeared in the 2013 sci-fi film Riddick alongside Vin Diesel.

In March 2014 it was reported that Nable would appear in the Nine Network's upcoming miniseries Gallipoli.

On 4 September, 2014, Stephen Amell announced on Facebook that Nable would portray the role of Ra's al Ghul on the third season of Arrow. Despite Liam Neeson (Ra's al Ghul in The Dark Knight Trilogy) expressing an interest in reprising his role for the television series' third season and the CW Network reaching out to him, he was unavailable and Nable was cast as Ra's instead. IGN's Jesse Scheeden said he brought "charisma and danger to the part". Nable portrayed the character in ten episodes of the third season. He reprised his role in a first season episode of Legends of Tomorrow.

In October 2019, Nable starred in the opening cinematic of the 2019 Bathurst 1000, broadcast on Fox Sports Australia. Nable has since featured in numerous Fox Sports cinematics, promotions and advertisements, primarily for their Rugby League division, Fox League.

Filmography

Film

Television

Bibliography

Books
 We Don't Live Here Anymore (2009)
 Faces in the Clouds (2011)
 Guilt (2015)
 Still (2021)

References

External links
 
 Matt Nable at yesterdayshero.com.au

1972 births
Living people
21st-century Australian male actors
21st-century Australian novelists
21st-century Australian screenwriters
Actors from Sydney
Australian Book Review people
Australian children's writers
Australian filmmakers
Australian male film actors
Australian male television actors
Australian rugby league players
Australian screenwriters
Carlisle RLFC players
London Broncos players
Manly Warringah Sea Eagles players
Place of birth missing (living people)
Rugby league locks
Rugby league players from Sydney
South Sydney Rabbitohs players
Sportsmen from New South Wales
Writers from Sydney
Australian expatriate sportspeople in England